4-Vinylpyridine is an organic compound with the formula CH2CHC5H4N.  It is a derivative of pyridine with a vinyl group in the 4-position.  It is a colorless liquid, although impure samples are often brown.  It is a monomeric precursor to specialty polymers.  4-Vinylpyridine is prepared by the condensation of 4-methylpyridine and formaldehyde.

See also
 2-Vinylpyridine

References

4-Pyridyl compounds
Monomers
Vinyl compounds